Money Talks may refer to:

Film and television
Money Talks (1926 film), lost MGM film
Money Talks (1932 film), British film by Norman Lee
Money Talks (1972 film), hidden-camera documentary film by Allen Funt
Money Talks (1997 film), comedy film directed by Brett Ratner and starring Chris Tucker and Charlie Sheen
Money Talks (TV series), 2009 adult reality game show on Playboy TV
Money Talks News, a nationally syndicated financial news program
"Money Talks" (SpongeBob SquarePants), an episode of SpongeBob SquarePants
"Money Talks", an episode of Mystery Science Theater 3000

Music

Albums
Money Talks (The Bar-Kays album), 1978
Money Talks (Trooper album), 1982
Money Talks, a 1987 album by Cryptic Slaughter
Money Talks (soundtrack) (1997), with its title track by Andrea Martin & Lil' Kim

Songs
"Money Talks", a 1972 song by Mack Rice
"Money Talks" (The Kinks song), 1974
"Money Talks", a 1982 song by Rick James from Throwin' Down
"Money Talks", a 1983 song by J.J. Cale from #8
"Money Talks", a 1983 song by April Wine from Animal Grace
"Money Talks", a 1984 song by Soul Asylum from Say What You Will, Clarence... Karl Sold the Truck
"Money Talks", a 1987 song by the Alan Parsons Project from Gaudi
 "Dirty Cash" (Money Talks), a 1989 song by The Adventures of Stevie V
"Moneytalks", a 1990 song by AC/DC from The Razors Edge
"Money Talks", a 1991 song by Living Colour from Biscuits
"Money Talks", a 1994 song by Wolfsbane from Wolfsbane
"Money Talks", a 2001 song by Saga from House of Cards
"Money Talks", a 2005 song by Deep Purple from Rapture of the Deep
"Money Talks", a 2007 song by the Player Piano from Satellite

See also
 Money Talk (disambiguation)